George Adrian Robinson (born 3 November 1949) is a former first-class cricketer who played for Oxford University in 1970 and 1971.

George Robinson was educated at Preston Catholic College in Lancashire before going up to Pembroke College, Oxford. A wicketkeeper-batsman, he played several useful innings for Oxford in the 1971 season, at first in the middle order and then later as an opener, partnering Keith Jones. He was Oxford's highest scorer in 1971 with 546 runs at an average of 26.00, "the only player who could put his head down and graft when things were going wrong".

References

External links
 
 George Robinson at CricketArchive

1949 births
Living people
Alumni of Pembroke College, Oxford
Cricketers from Preston, Lancashire
English cricketers
Oxford University cricketers